This is a list of consorts of Nevers.

Countess of Nevers

House of Nevers, 990–1192

Capetian House of Courtenay, 1192–1257 
None

House of Dampierre, 1257–1262 
None

House of Burgundy, 1262–1280 
None

House of Dampierre, 1280–1384

House of Valois-Burgundy, 1384–1491

House of La Marck, 1491–1521

Duchess of Nevers

House of La Marck, 1521–1601

Mancini family, 1659–1798

See also 
List of consorts of Auxerre
List of consorts of Tonnerre
List of Burgundian consorts
List of consorts of Rethels
Countess of Flanders
List of consorts of Étampes
Countess of Eu

Sources 
BURGUNDY DUCHY NOBILITY:COMTES de NEVERS

 
 
Nevers
Nevers